Michael John "Duke" Robillard (born October 4, 1948) is an American guitarist and singer. He founded the band Roomful of Blues and was a member of the Fabulous Thunderbirds. Although Robillard is known as a rock and blues guitarist, he also plays jazz and swing.

Career

He played in bands as Mike "Honey Bear" Robillard and worked for the Guild Guitar Company. In 1967, he and Al Copley founded the band Roomful of Blues.

He spent over ten years with Roomful of Blues before departing in 1979, becoming the guitarist for singer Robert Gordon and then a member of the Legendary Blues Band. He started the Duke Robillard Band in 1981, eventually adopting the name Duke Robillard and the Pleasure Kings, with whom he toured throughout the 1980s and recorded for Rounder Records. He became a member of the Fabulous Thunderbirds in 1990 to replace Jimmie Vaughan.

Although he was a member of bands, Robillard simultaneously pursued a solo career in which he toured and recorded solo albums in other genres, such as jazz and blues. He formed a duo with jazz guitarist Herb Ellis and the swing trio New Guitar Summit with Gerry Beaudoin and Jay Geils. He explored jump blues in A Swingin Session with Duke Robillard, returned to his rhythm and blues roots in Stomp! The Blues Tonight, and covered blues songs from the 1940s and '50s in Low Down and Tore Up. Briefly in 2013, he was the guitarist for Bob Dylan's tour.

Awards and honors
 Best Blues Guitarist, W. C. Handy Award, 2000, 2001
 Grammy nomination, Best Contemporary Blues Album, Guitar Groove-a-Rama, 2007 
 Grammy nomination, Best Traditional Blues Album, Stomp! The Blues Tonight, 2010

Discography

As leader/co-leader
 Duke Robillard & the Pleasure Kings (1984) (Rounder)
 Too Hot to Handle (1985) (Rounder)
 Swing (1987) (Rounder)
 You Got Me (1988) (Rounder)
 Rockin' Blues (1988) (Rounder) compilation
 After Hours Swing Session (1990) (Rounder)
 Turn it Around (1991) (Rounder)
 Temptation (1994) (Point Blank)
 Duke's Blues (1996) (Point Blank)
 Dangerous Place (1997) (Point Blank)
 Stretchin' Out Live (1998) (Stony Plain)
 New Blues for Modern Man (1999) (Shanachie)
 La Palette Bleue (1999) (Dixie Frog)
 Conversations in Swing Guitar with Herb Ellis (1999) (Stony Plain)
 Explorer (2000) (Shanachie)
 Living with the Blues (2002) (Stony Plain)
 More Conversations In Swing Guitar with Herb Ellis (2003) (Stony Plain)
 Exalted Lover (2003) (Stony Plain)
 Blue Mood: The Songs of T-Bone Walker (2004) (Stony Plain)
 The Duke Meets the Earl with Ronnie Earl (2005) (Stony Plain)
 Guitar Groove-a-Rama (2006) (Stony Plain)
 Duke Robillard's World of Blues (2007) (Stony Plain)
 A Swingin' Session with Duke Robillard (2008) (Stony Plain)
 Stomp! The Blues Tonight (2009) (Stony Plain)
 Tales from the Tiki Lounge with Sunny Crownover (2010) (Blue Duchess)
 Passport to the Blues (2010) (Stony Plain)
 Low Down and Tore Up (2011) (Stony Plain)
 Wobble Walkin'  (2012) (Blue Duchess)
 Independently Blue (2013) (Stony Plain)
 Calling All Blues (2014) (Stony Plain)
 The Acoustic Blues & Roots of Duke Robillard (2015) (Stony Plain)
 Blues Full Circle (2016) (Stony Plain)
 Duke Robillard and His Dames of Rhythm (2017) (M.C. Records)
 Ear Worms  (2019) (Stony Plain)
 Blues Bash! (2020) (Stony Plain) 
 Swingin' Again with Scott Hamilton (2021) (Blue Duchess)
 They Called It Rhythm & Blues (2022) (Stony Plain)

With Roomful of Blues
 Roomful of Blues (1978)
 Let's Have a Party (1979)
 Swingin' and Jumpin'  (1999) compilation

With The Fabulous Thunderbirds
 Walk That Walk, Talk That Talk (1991)
 Wrap It Up (1993) compilation

With New Guitar Summit (Duke Robillard/Jay Geils/Gerry Beaudoin)
 New Guitar Summit (Stony Plain, 2004)
 Live at the Stoneham Theater (Stony Plain, 2004)
 Shivers (Stony Plain, 2009)

As sideman or guest
With Al Basile
 Blue Ink (2004)
 Down on Providence Plantation (2005)
 Groovin' in the Mood Room (2006)
 The Tinge (2008)
 Soul Blue (2009)
 The Goods (2010)
 At Home Next Door (2012)

With Joe Beard
 For Real (AudioQuest, 1998)
 Dealin'  (AudioQuest, 2000)

With Gerry Beaudoin
 Minor Swing (1994)
 Swing Cafe (2005)

With Eddy Clearwater
 Cool Blues (1998)
 Reservation Blues (2000)

With Al Copley
 Royal Blue (1991)
 Good Understanding (1994)

With Ronnie Earl
 Soul Searchin'  (1988)
 Test of Time (1992) compilation

With Sax Gordon
 Have Horn, Will Travel (1998)
 You Knock Me Out (2000)

With Scott Hamilton
 Blues, Bop & Ballads (1999)
 Across the Tracks (2008)
 Remembering Billie (2013)

With Jay McShann
 Hootie's Jumpin' Blues (1997)
 Still Jumpin' the Blues (1999)
 Goin' to Kansas City (2003)

With Jerry Portnoy
 Poison Kisses (1991)
 Home Run Hitter (1995)
 Down in the Mood Room (2002)

With Jimmy Witherspoon
 Spoon's Blues (1995)
 Jimmy Witherspoon with the Duke Robillard Band (2000)

With others
 Too Cool to Move, Snooky Pryor (1992) (Antone's)
 Pinetop's Boogie Woogie, Pinetop Perkins (1992) (Antone's)
 Toolin' Around Arlen Roth (1993) (Blue Plate)
 Married to the Blues, Mark Hummel (1995) (Flying Fish)
 Found True Love, John Hammond (1996) (Point Blank)
 Time Out of Mind, Bob Dylan (1997) (Columbia)
 Wiggle Outta This, Curtis Salgado (1999)
 The Blues Keep Me Holding On, Savoy Brown (1999)
 Good Day for the Blues, Ruth Brown (1999)
 West Coast House Party, Kid Ramos (2000)
 Three Feet Off the Ground, Bruce Katz (2000)
 Memphis, Tennessee, Rosco Gordon (2000)
 Blow Mr. Low, Doug James (2001)
 Love the Game, Debbie Davies (2001)
 Boogie 'n' Shuffle, Billy Boy Arnold (2001)
 Guitar, Jimmy Thackery (2003)
 Blues in My Heart, Chris Flory (2003)
 Introducing... Sunny and Her Joy Boys (2009)
 Between a Rock and the Blues, Joe Louis Walker (2009)
 Porchlight, Todd Sharpville (2010)

References

External links

Official Duke Robillard website

1948 births
Living people
American blues guitarists
American blues singers
American male singers
Contemporary blues musicians
Jazz-blues guitarists
American rockabilly guitarists
American male guitarists
People from Woonsocket, Rhode Island
Songwriters from Rhode Island
American people of French-Canadian descent
Guitarists from Rhode Island
The Fabulous Thunderbirds members
20th-century American guitarists
20th-century American male musicians
American male jazz musicians
American male songwriters